Kukherd Rural District is a rural district (dehestan) in the Kukherd District of Bastak County, Hormozgan Province, Iran. At the 2006 census, its population (including Kukherd, which was detached from the rural district and promoted to city status) was 5,950, in 1,206 families; excluding Kukherd, the population was 5,950, in 1206 families. The rural district has 27  villages.

References

External links 
 Kookherd website

Rural Districts of Hormozgan Province
Bastak County
Kukherd District